The 1956 Coupe de France Final was a football match held at Stade Olympique Yves-du-Manoir, Colombes on 27 May 1956, that saw UA Sedan-Torcy defeat AS Troyes Savinienne 3–1 thanks to goals by Diego Cuenca and Pierre Tillon.

Match details

See also
1955–56 Coupe de France

External links 
Coupe de France results at Rec.Sport.Soccer Statistics Foundation
Report on French federation site

Coupe
1956
Coupe De France Final 1956
Coupe De France Final 1956
Sport in Hauts-de-Seine
May 1956 sports events in Europe
1956 in Paris